Sealdah Assembly constituency was a Legislative Assembly constituency of Kolkata district in the Indian state of West Bengal.

Overview
As a consequence of the orders of the Delimitation Commission, Sealdah Assembly constituency ceases to exist from 2011.

It was part of Calcutta North East (Lok Sabha constituency).

Members of Legislative Assembly

Results

2009 Bye-election
A bye-election was held on 18 August 2009 following the resignation of the sitting MLA, Somen Mitra who was elected as MP In Parliament from Diamond Harbour (Lok Sabha constituency).Sikha Mitra of Trinamool Congress Defeated Prabir Deb of CPI.

2006
In the 2006 elections, Somendra Nath Mitra of INC defeated his nearest rival Prabir Deb of CPI

 

 
 
 
 
 

.# Swing calculated on Trinamool Congress+BJP vote percentages taken together in 2006.

1977-2009
In the 2009 by-election, necessitated by the election of sitting MLA, Somendra Nath Mitra, to the Parliament from the Diamond Harbour (Lok Sabha constituency), Shikha Mitra of Trinamool Congress won the Sealdah assembly seat. In the 2006, 2001, 1996, 1991, 1987 and 1982 state assembly elections Somendra Nath Mitra of Congress won the 156 Sealdah assembly seat defeating his nearest rivals Prabir Deb of CPI in 2006, Chanchal Ghosh of CPI in 2001, Arun Prakash Chatterjee of CPI in 1996, Ila Mitra of CPI in 1991, Nanda Gopal Bhattacharjee of CPI in 1987 and 1982. Binoy Banerjee of Janata Party had won the seat in 1977 defeating Amar Prasad Chakraborty of Forward Bloc.

1967-1972
Somendranath Mitra of Congress won in 1972. Benoy Banerjee of Congress won in 1971. Jatin Chakraborty of RSP won in 1969. Pratap Chandra Chunder of Congress won in 1967. Prior to that the Seadah seat was not there. There was a seat at Muchipara.

1951-1962 Muchipara
Pratap Chandra Chunder of Congress won in 1962. Jatin Chakraborty, Independent, won in 1957. Sankar Prasad Mitra of Congress won the Muchipara seat in independent India’s first election in 1951.

References

Former assembly constituencies of West Bengal
Politics of Kolkata district